A country club is a privately owned club, often with a membership quota and admittance by invitation or sponsorship, that generally offers both a variety of recreational sports and facilities for dining and entertaining.  Typical athletic offerings are golf, tennis, and swimming. Where golf is the principal or sole sporting activity, and especially outside of the United States and Canada, it is common for a country club to be referred to simply as a golf club.

Country clubs are most commonly located in city outskirts or suburbs, due to the requirement of having substantial grounds for outdoor activities, which distinguishes them from an urban athletic club.

Country clubs originated in Scotland and first appeared in the US in the early 1880s. Country clubs had a profound effect on expanding suburbanization and are considered to be the precursor to gated community development.

By nation

United States and Canada  
Country clubs can be exclusive organizations.  In small towns, membership in the country club is often not as exclusive or expensive as in larger cities where there is competition for a limited number of memberships.  In addition to the fees, some clubs have additional requirements to join.  For example, membership can be limited to those who reside in a particular housing  community.

Country clubs were founded by upper-class elites between 1880 and 1930.  By 1907, country clubs were claimed to be “the very essence of American upper-class.”  The number of country clubs increased greatly with industrialization, the rise in incomes, and suburbanization in the 1920s.  During the 1920s, country clubs acted as community social centers.  When people lost most of their income and net worth during the Great Depression,  the number of country clubs decreased drastically for lack of membership funding.

Historically, many country clubs were "restricted" and refused to admit members of specific racial, ethnic or religious groups such as Jews and Catholics. Beginning in the 1960s civil rights lawsuits forced clubs to drop exclusionary policies. In a 1990 landmark ruling at Shoal Creek Golf and Country Club, the PGA refused to hold tournaments at private clubs that practiced racial discrimination. This new regulation led to the admittance of black people at private clubs. The incident at Shoal Creek is comparable to the 1966 NCAA basketball tournament, which led to the end of racial discrimination in college basketball.

The Philadelphia Cricket Club is the oldest organized country club in the United States devoted to playing games, while The Country Club in Brookline, Massachusetts is the oldest club devoted to golf.

United Kingdom 
In the United Kingdom, many country clubs are simply golf clubs, and play a smaller role in their communities than American country clubs; gentlemen's clubs in Britain—many of which admit women while remaining socially exclusive—fill many roles of the United States' country clubs.

Spain

Similar to the United States, Spain has had a tradition of country clubs as a pillar of social life. This began during the reign of Alfonso XII and was consolidated during the reign of his son and successor Alfonso XIII, who granted royal status to a handful of country clubs. Most country clubs in Spain are typically associated with the upper classes, and were conceived around a central sport such as golf, polo or tennis, although some of them did eventually offer other sports. Examples include Real Club de la Puerta de Hierro, Club de Campo Villa de Madrid, Real Club de Polo de Barcelona, Real Sociedad de Golf de Neguri, Real Club Pineda etc. Many of them are also located in those cities or towns that hosted the summer vacations of the royal family. Such is the case of Real Sociedad de Tenis de la Magdalena, Real Golf de Pedreña or Real Golf Club de Zarauz for example. The most notable difference between Spanish and American country clubs is that the former are not normally located in the countryside but either within a city or town itself or in the outskirts at most.

Indian subcontinent 
Many of the gentlemen's clubs established during the British Raj are still active in major cities, for example the Bangalore Club, Nizam Club, and Bengal Club.

Gymkhanas are sporting or social clubs across the subcontinent.

Australia 
 Country clubs exist in multiple forms, including athletic-based clubs and golf clubs.  Examples are the Breakfast Point Country Club and Cumberland Grove Country Club in Sydney, the Castle Hill Country Club, the Gold Coast Polo & Country Club, Elanora Country Club, and the Sanctuary Cove's Country Club.

Japan 
In Japan, almost all golf clubs are called "Country Clubs" by their owners.

See also 
Jewish country club
Membership discrimination in California clubs

References

Bibliography
 

Sports culture
 
Clubs and societies
High society (social class)
Upper class culture